Zebulon is the sixth son of Jacob and Leah in the Hebrew Bible.

Zebulon, Zebulun or Zébulon may also refer to:

Bible
Tribe of Zebulun, ancient Israelite tribe, descendants of Zebulon

Characters from popular culture
Sgt. Zebulon Gant, a character of the film The Last Samurai
Zebulon, a character in the American television series The Waltons
Zebulon Prescott, a character in the American Western film How the West Was Won
Zebulon Macahan, a character in the American Western television series How the West Was Won
Zebulon, a character in the animated television series The Magic Roundabout

Music
Zebulon (album), a 1988 album by American jazz musician Michael Bisio
Zébulon (band), music group from Quebec, Canada
Zebulon Cafe Concert, music venue and bar in Los Angeles, California
"Zebulon", a song from the "Facing Giants" single series by AllttA
"Zebulon", a song on the album All Days Are Nights: Songs for Lulu by Rufus Wainwright
"Zebulon", a song on the album Tabula Rasa by Einstürzende Neubauten

Places
Zebulon, Georgia, U.S.
Zebulon, North Carolina, U.S.
Zebulon Valley or Zvulun Valley, part of Israel's northern coastal plain in the Galilee
Zevulun Regional Council, an Israeli administrative subdivision in the above valley.

Trains
Zébulon, a prototype TGV train
Zébulon (Paris Métro), former Paris Métro rolling stock

People with the given name
Zebulun (Khazar) (ninth century), Jewish Turkic ruler of the Khazars
Zebulon Baird Vance (1830–1894), American Confederate Colonel and North Carolina Governor
Zebulon Brockway (1827–1920), American penologist
Zebulon Butler (1731–1795), American colonial soldier and leader
William Zebulon Foster (1881–1961), American labor organizer and Marxist politician
Zebulon Aiton Lash (1846-1920), Canadian lawyer, civil servant, and businessman
Zebulon Pike (1779–1813), American soldier, and eponym of Pikes Peak in Colorado
Zebulon Scoville, NASA Flight Director and lead flight director of Crew Dragon Demo-2
Zebulon Weaver (1872–1948), American politician

See also

Zeb (disambiguation)
Zebuleon, an angel mentioned in the Greek Apocalypse of Ezra